The Endumeni Local Municipality council consists of thirteen members elected by mixed-member proportional representation. Seven councillors are elected by first-past-the-post voting in seven wards, while the remaining six are chosen from party lists so that the total number of party representatives is proportional to the number of votes received.

Results 
The following table shows the composition of the council after past elections.

December 2000 election

The following table shows the results of the 2000 election.

March 2006 election

The following table shows the results of the 2006 election.

May 2011 election

The following table shows the results of the 2011 election.

August 2016 election

The following table shows the results of the 2016 election.

No party obtained a majority. The Inkatha Freedom Party (IFP) formed a government with the support of the Democratic Alliance (DA) and the Economic Freedom Fighters (EFF).

August 2016 to November 2021 by-elections

In a by-election held in March 2019 the ANC won a ward previously held by the IFP, giving the party an outright majority. This majority was expanded further when ANC won another ward from the DA in June the same year. The council was reconstituted as seen below:

November 2021 election

The following table shows the results of the 2021 election.

References

Endumeni
Elections in KwaZulu-Natal
Umzinyathi District Municipality